Monadic may refer to:

 Monadic, a relation or function having an arity of one in logic, mathematics, and computer science
 Monadic, an adjunction if and only if it is equivalent to the adjunction given by the Eilenberg–Moore algebras of its associated monad, in category theory
 Monadic, in computer programming, a feature, type, or function related to a monad (functional programming)
 Monadic or univalent, a chemical valence
 Monadic, in theology, a religion or philosophy possessing a concept of a divine Monad

See also
 Monadic predicate calculus, in logic
 Monad (disambiguation)